The list of political families of Bihar state of India:

Yadav Family
Lalu Prasad Yadav and Rabri Devi are married since 1973 and the couple have 9 children (2 sons and 7 daughters)

 Lalu Prasad Yadav, former Chief Minister of Bihar (1990-1997) and former Union Railways Minister of India (2004-2009)
 Rabri Devi, former Chief Minister of Bihar and current MLC of Bihar Legislative Council (wife of Lalu)
 Tej Pratap Yadav Cabinet Minister of Health in Government of Bihar (elder son of Lalu)
 Tejashwi Yadav, former IPL cricketer and Deputy Chief Minister of Bihar (younger son of Lalu)
 Misa Bharti, MP in  Rajya Sabha (eldest daughter of Lalu)
 Rohini Acharya Yadav, (2nd daughter of Lalu)
 Chanda Yadav, (3rd daughter of Lalu)
 Ragini Yadav, (4th daughter of Lalu) - married to Rahul Yadav, Samajwadi Party leader, Rahul lost Sikandrabad assembly seat in 2017 and 2022.
 Hema Yadav, (5th daughter of Lalu)
 Anushka Yadav (6th daughter of Lalu) - married to Chiranjeev Rao, MLA of Rewari
 Raj Lakshmi Yadav (youngest daughter of Lalu) - married to Tej Pratap Singh Yadav, former MP of Mainpuri (2014-19).
 Sadhu Yadav, former MP of Gopalganj (2004-09) (brother of Rabri Devi)
 Subhash Prasad Yadav, former MP of Rajya Sabha (2004-10) (brother of Rabri Devi)

Mandal Family
B.P. Mandal - Former Chief Minister of Bihar.
Dhanik Lal Mandal - Former Governor of Haryana.
Uday Mandal - President of Samata Party, initially formed in 1994 by George Fernandes

Mishra Family
Lalit Narayan Mishra - Former Railway Minister of India
Jagannath Mishra - younger brother of Lalit Narayan Mishra, Former Chief Minister of Bihar and Union Cabinet Minister of India
Vijay Kumar Mishra - Eldest son of Lalit Narayan Mishra. Currently member of the Bihar Legislative Council, former Member of Parliament, three terms MLA and active politician of Bihar Janta Dal (United)
Nitish Mishra - Youngest son of Dr. Jagannath Mishra. Cabinet Minister of Rural Development Department in Government of Bihar and currently Member of the Bihar Legislative Assembly.
Rishi Mishra - Former Member of the Bihar Legislative Assembly and the son of Vijay Kumar Mishra
Gouri Shankar Rajhans - Former MP and married to niece of Lalit Narayan Mishra

Family of Jagdeo Prasad Kushwaha 
 Jagdeo Prasad - freedom fighter, member of Shoshit Samaj Dal and former Deputy Chief Minister of Bihar 
 Nagmani Kushwaha - former Union Minister of India (1999-2004) (son of Jagdeo Prasad)
 Suchitra Sinha Kushwaha - former Cabinet Minister of Bihar (daughter-in-law of Jagdeo Prasad)
 Satish Prasad Singh - former Chief Minister of Bihar (Jan 1968 to Feb 1968) (father of Suchitra Sinha)

Family of Samrat Chaudhary Kushwaha 
Shakuni Choudhury - seven times Member of Legislative Assembly, former MP from Bihar and  Cabinet Minister in Government of Bihar. Assumed important posts in Rashtriya Janata Dal and many other parties.
 Samrat Chaudhary - Member of the Bihar Legislative Council from Bhartiya Janata Party. Currently cabinet minister in Government of Bihar and was also the Minister in Rabri Devi and Jitan Ram Manjhi cabinet. Former Vice President of Bharatiya Janata Party Bihar unit and son of Shakuni Choudhury.

Mahto Family
 Rambalak Mahto - Longest serving Advocate General of Bihar, Legal advisor to both the Nitish Kumar and Lalu Prasad Yadav.
 Birendra Mahto - MLA of Teghra (2015-2020) (son of Rambalak Mahto)

Paswan family
Ram Vilas Paswan - Former Union Minister of Railways, Consumer Affairs, Food and Public Distribution Departments.
Chirag Paswan - Bollywood actor and Member of Parliament from Jamui. Son of Ram Vilas Paswan.
Ram Chandra Paswan - Brother of Ram Vilas Paswan and former Member of Parliament from Samastipur.
Pashupati Kumar Paras - Brother of Ram Vilas Paswan. Union Cabinet Minister of Food and Public Distribution Department in the Ministry of Narendra Modi. Member of Parliament from Hajipur loksabha constituency. Former member of the Bihar Legislative Council (MLC) and Bihar Legislative Assembly (MLA).

Jagjivan Ram Family
 Jagjivan Ram - Independence Activist and Deputy Prime Minister of India.
Mira Kumar - Daughter of Babu Jagjivan Ram and first woman Speaker of Lok Sabha.

Ranjan family
 Pappu Yadav - former MP of Madhepura (2014-2019).
 Ranjeet Ranjan - former MP of Supaul (2014-2019) and present MP in Rajya Sabha.

Sinha Family
 Dr. Anugrah Narayan Sinha - Statesman, freedom fighter and first Deputy Chief Minister of Bihar from year 1946–1957.
Satyendra Narayan Sinha -  freedom fighter, Member of Provisional Parliament from year 1950-1952, Chief Minister of Bihar and leader of JP movement, son of Anugrah Narayan Sinha.
Kishori Sinha - Former Member of Parliament, wife of Satyendra Narayan Sinha
Nikhil Kumar - Governor of Kerala, son of Satyendra Narayan Sinha
Shyama Singh - Member of Parliament, wife of Nikhil Kumar
Rameshwar Prasad Sinha - father of Kishori Sinha, Member Constituent Assembly of India (1947–1950), MLA, Bihar (1937-1939)
N. K. Singh - Rajya Sabha MP, brother-in-law of Nikhil Kumar
Uday Singh - Member of Parliament, Nikhil Kumar's younger brother-in-law
Madhuri Singh - former MP, Nikhil Kumar's mother-in-law

Thakur Jugal Kishore Sinha Family
Sadhu Sharan Singh - Nationalist, congressman and father of Thakur Jugal Kishore Sinha
Thakur Jugal Kishore Sinha - Freedom fighter, Member of the first Lok Sabha and known as the father of Cooperative Movement in India.
Ram Dulari Sinha - Wife of Thakur Jugal Kishore Sinha, freedom fighter, Member of the first Vidhan Sabha, Union Minister and Governor, first woman from Bihar to attain a master's degree.
 Madhurendra Kumar Singh - Member All India Congress Committee, former Director Central Warehousing Corporation and Bihar State Cooperative Bank. 
 Mrigendra Kumar Singh - son of Dr. Madhurendra Kumar Singh. State Secretary of Bihar Pradesh Congress Committee, former President of Sheohar Loksabha Youth Congress.

Chandrashekhar Singh Family
 Chandrashekhar Singh - former Chief Minister of Bihar (1983-1985) and former Union Minister in Government of India. 
 Manorama Singh - former MP from Banka (1984-85 and 1986-89) (wife of Chandra shekhar).

Family of Rama Devi
 Rama Devi - MP of Sheohar (2009-Present) and former MP of Motihari (1998-99).
 Braj Bihari Prasad - former Minister of Science and Technology in Government of Bihar (husband of Rama Devi)
 Raveesh Kumar, IFS officer, current Ambassador of India to Finland and former Spokesperson for the Ministry of External Affairs. (son-in-law of Rama Devi)

Azad Family
Bhagwat Jha Azad, former Chief Minister of Bihar (1988-89).
Kirti Azad, Lok Sabha MP from Darbhanga (1999-2004 and 2009-2019).

References 

 
Bihar
Bihar-related lists